Ernesto Guerra Da Cal (1911–1994) was a Galician writer and philologist. An active Galician nationalist, he fought in the Spanish Civil War in the Republican side.

He was one of the first theorists of Galician Reintegrationism. 
 
Exiled in the USA, he was professor emeritus of Spanish and comparative literature, Queens College, City University of New York.

His son is the historian Enric Ucelay-Da Cal.

References 

1911 births
1994 deaths
City University of New York faculty
Spanish philologists
20th-century philologists
Spanish emigrants to the United States